Krunoslav "Kićo" Slabinac (28 March 1944 – 13 November 2020) was a Croatian pop singer. His specialties were the songs nowadays inspired by folk music of Slavonia region of Croatia, and the uses of traditional instruments such as the tamburica.

In the 1960s Slabinac was a member of several rock'n'roll bands. He then opted for a solo career as a pop singer and moved to Zagreb. While performing in a club, he was noticed by Nikica Kalogjera who gave him a chance to appear as a newcomer at the 1969 Split Festival. A year later, in 1970, Slabinac won the first prize at the Opatija Festival. He represented Yugoslavia at the Eurovision Song Contest 1971 with "Tvoj dječak je tužan", placing 14th.

Slabinac's song "Zbog jedne divne crne žene" was a huge hit which solidified his status as a singer. However, in the 1970s, legal troubles and time spent abroad set back his career. After his return from the United States, Slabinac focused on folk music, although he remained active in the pop music scene.

His song "Letaj mi" became an evergreen in Macedonia, particularly because it was sung in Macedonian on the festival "MakFest" in 1989.

He died on 13 November 2020 in Zagreb, following a long and complicated illness.

Discography
 1971 – Tvoj dječak je tužan
 1975 – Hej bećari
 1978 – Pusti noćas svoje kose
 1979 – Seoska sam lola
 1984 – Krunoslav Slabinac
 1984 – Christmas with Kićo
 1985 – Stani suzo
 1986 – Da l' se sjećaš
 1987 – Oj, garava, garava
 1988 – Tiho, tiho uspomeno
 1991 – Za tebe
 1995 – Ako zora ne svane
 1995 – Sve najbolje
 2006 – Zlatna kolekcija
 2008 – Dignite čaše svatovi
 2015 – 50 originalnih pjesama

References

External links
 
 
 Krunoslav Kićo Slabinac 

1944 births
2020 deaths
Croatian pop singers
20th-century Croatian male singers
Yugoslav male singers
Eurovision Song Contest entrants for Yugoslavia
Eurovision Song Contest entrants of 1971
People from Osijek
21st-century Croatian male singers
Burials at Mirogoj Cemetery